The Mark 39 nuclear bomb and W39  nuclear warhead were versions of an American thermonuclear weapon, which were in service from 1957 to 1966.

The Mark 39 design was a thermonuclear bomb (see Teller-Ulam design) and had a yield of 3.8 megatons.  It weighed 6,500–6,750 pounds (2,950–3,060 kilograms), and was about 11 feet, 8 inches long (3.556 meters) with a diameter of 2 feet, 11 inches (88.9 centimeters).The design is an improved Mark 15 nuclear bomb design (the TX-15-X3 design and Mark 39 Mod 0 were the same design).  The Mark 15 was the first lightweight US thermonuclear bomb.

It was used on the SM-62 Snark missile, PGM-11 Redstone short-range ballistic missile, and in the B-58 Hustler weapons pod.

Goldsboro Incident

Two Mark 39 nuclear bombs that were carried by a B-52 Stratofortress broke up in the air and crashed near Goldsboro, North Carolina on January 24, 1961.  According to Parker F. Jones, a supervisor of nuclear safety at Sandia National Laboratories, in a 1969 report that was declassified in 2013, the Mark 39 bomb had four safety mechanisms, one of which was not effective in the air. On one of the bombs involved, two more safety mechanisms were "rendered ineffective by aircraft breakup." As a result, Jones noted that the bomb was prevented from detonating only by the fourth mechanism, a simple "ready-safe" electric switch.

Michael H. Maggelet and James C. Oskins, authors of Broken Arrow: The Declassified History of U.S. Nuclear Weapons Accidents, dispute the claim citing a declassified report. They claim that arm-ready switch was in the safe position, the high-voltage battery was not activated which would preclude charging of the firing circuit and neutron generator necessary for detonation, and the rotary safing switch was destroyed precluding energisation of the x-unit (firing capacitors). The tritium reservoir used for fusion boosting was also full and had not been injected into the weapon primary. This would have resulted in a significantly reduced primary yield and would not have ignited the weapon's fusion secondary stage.

Survivors
 A Mark 39 casing is on display in the Cold War Gallery of the National Museum of the United States Air Force in Dayton, Ohio. The bomb was received from the National Atomic Museum at Kirtland Air Force Base, N.M., in 1993.

See also
 List of nuclear weapons

References

External links
 Allbombs.html list of all US nuclear weapons at nuclearweaponarchive.org

Cold War aerial bombs of the United States
Nuclear bombs of the United States
Military equipment introduced in the 1950s